Himmelstalund is a large park/open space in Norrköping, Sweden.

The park is famous for having one of Sweden's biggest collection of petroglyphs with more than 1660 pictures. Some of the depicted boats having a similar shape as the Hjortspring boat.

Petroglyphs

Parks in Sweden
Geography of Östergötland County
Tourist attractions in Östergötland County